Fedoseyevka is the name of several rural localities in Russia:
Fedoseyevka, Belgorod Oblast, a selo in Starooskolsky District of Belgorod Oblast
Fedoseyevka, Murmansk Oblast, a selo in Belomorsky Territorial Okrug of Kandalakshsky District of Murmansk Oblast
Fedoseyevka, Omsk Oblast, a village in Krasnousovsky Rural Okrug of Tyukalinsky District of Omsk Oblast
Fedoseyevka, Orenburg Oblast, a settlement in Novosimbirsky Selsoviet of Kuvandyksky District of Orenburg Oblast
Fedoseyevka, Oryol Oblast, a village in Novosinetsky Selsoviet of Bolkhovsky District of Oryol Oblast
Fedoseyevka, Neklinovsky District, Rostov Oblast, a settlement in Troitskoye Rural Settlement of Neklinovsky District of Rostov Oblast
Fedoseyevka, Zavetinsky District, Rostov Oblast, a selo in Fedoseyevskoye Rural Settlement of Zavetinsky District of Rostov Oblast